Fashion Trend Center was a museum in Bangkok, Thailand, established in November 2005 and closed on 30 September 2006.

It covered a total area of 500 square metres located on the sixth floor of the
offices at Central World Plaza and was run by the government.

References

Museums in Bangkok
Defunct museums
Museums established in 2005
2005 establishments in Thailand
Museums disestablished in 2006